Avec amour is the tenth studio album by Azalia Snail, released in 2005 by True Classical.

Track listing

Personnel 
Adapted from Avec Amour liner notes.

Azalia Snail – vocals, guitar, keyboards, percussion, illustrations, art direction
Musicians
Tanya Haden – cello
Gary Ramon – guitar, bass guitar, drums, percussion, engineering

Production and additional personnel
Dave Cooley – mastering
Dan Monick – photography

Release history

References

External links 
 Avec Amour at Discogs (list of releases)

2005 albums
Azalia Snail albums